Esporte Clube Jacuipense, commonly known as Jacuipense, is a Brazilian professional football club based in Riachão do Jacuípe, Bahia. They play in the Série D, the fourth tier of Brazilian football, as well as in the Baianão, the top flight of the Bahia state football league.

History
The club was founded on April 21, 1965. Jacuipense finished in the second place in the Campeonato Baiano Second Level in 2012 and was champion of the same tournament in 1989.

Honours
 Campeonato Baiano Second Division:
 Winners (1): 1989

Stadium
Esporte Clube Jacuipense play their home games at Estádio Eliel Martins, nicknamed Valfredão. The stadium has a maximum capacity of 5,000 people.

References

Association football clubs established in 1965
Football clubs in Bahia
1965 establishments in Brazil